Nobunao (written: 信直 or 信復) is a masculine Japanese given name. Notable people with the name include:

 (1719–1768), Japanese daimyō
 (1546–1599), Japanese daimyō

Japanese masculine given names